Gary Tyler (born July 1958), from St. Rose, Louisiana, is an African-American man who is a former prisoner at the Louisiana State Prison in Angola, Louisiana. He was convicted of the October 7, 1974 shooting death of a white 13-year-old boy and the wounding of another, on a day of violent protests by whites against black students at Destrehan High School in St. Charles Parish, Louisiana. He was tried as an adult and convicted of first-degree murder at age 17 by an all-white jury; he received the mandatory death sentence for that crime, according to state law. When he entered Louisiana State Prison (Angola), he was the youngest person on death row.

In 1976 the United States Supreme Court ruled in Roberts v. Louisiana that the state's death penalty law was unconstitutional, as it required mandatory sentences for convictions of certain capital charges, without consideration of mitigating factors. The Supreme Court ordered state court reviews and the commutation of sentences of persons on death row to the next lower level of punishment. Tyler's sentence was commuted to life in prison without parole for 20 years. 

His defense appealed the conviction. The United States Court of Appeals for the Fifth Circuit ruled in 1980 that Tyler's trial had convicted him on "unconstitutional charges" and was "fundamentally unfair"; it remanded the case to the lower courts and ordered a new trial. But on state appeal, it changed its ruling in 1981, saying that attorney error by Tyler's original defense counsel did not allow redress. Tyler was recommended by the state parole board for a pardon, but governors had failed to act on this. 

Many observers believe that Tyler was wrongfully convicted, as his trial and defense were seriously flawed. Tyler's cause was taken up again in 2007 by human rights organizations and a variety of public figures after his case was reviewed by a columnist of the New York Times. In 2012 the United States Supreme Court ruled that persons who were minors at the time of a crime for which they were convicted, could not be sentenced to life imprisonment without parole, and applied this retroactively. It ordered state courts to review such cases. Tyler was released in 2016 after the state arranged a plea deal. He pleaded guilty to manslaughter, which had a maximum sentence of 21 years; since he had already served nearly twice that, he was released from prison.

Background
Gary Tyler is one of eleven children of Juanita and Uylos Tyler of St. Rose, Louisiana. His father was a maintenance worker who sometimes held three jobs; his mother worked as a domestic. His father died in 1989 of heart trouble. Tyler and his siblings attended local schools, which were segregated into the 1970s. When he was 16, he began to take the bus to Destrehan High School. Previously all-white, the school had conducted court-ordered desegregation since 1968, bussing black students to the school. In the school sessions in 1974, racial tensions had been rising, with fights breaking out in the halls and at games. The white community continued to resist desegregation and black students were harassed at the school by white students.

Events
In 1974 formerly all-white Destrehan High School in St. Charles Parish was filled with racial tensions among the students as the administration reluctantly integrated, 20 years after the ruling of Brown v. Board of Education (1954). The school board bussed black students to the school to achieve this. Because of fights breaking out and a violent protest being conducted by white students, officials closed the school early the day of the events.

Black students were sent home on their regular bus. On October 17, 1974, Tyler was 16 and on the bus. As they were leaving Destrehan High School, the bus was attacked by an angry mob of 100-200 whites, mostly students. The whites were angry about integration at the school. Timothy Weber, a 13-year-old boy standing outside the bus with other classmates, was shot and fatally wounded. He later died. Police searched the bus more than once, but no gun was ever found. The bus driver said he believed the shot had come from outside. All the students from the bus were taken to the police station and interrogated under extreme pressure.

Tyler was arrested for disturbing the peace when he talked back to a police officer; he was soon charged with the murder of 13-year-old Weber. His mother Juanita Tyler and he said that he was beaten severely by the police in an attempt to make him confess, but he refused. Other witnesses later told of being intimidated and threatened by the police. As columnist Bob Herbert wrote in 2007, "A white boy had been killed and some black had to pay. Mr. Tyler, as good a black as any, was taken to a sheriff’s substation where he was beaten unmercifully amid shouted commands that he confess. He would not."

The racially charged atmosphere had been heightened by the arrival of David Duke in Destrehan. He was emerging as a leader in the Ku Klux Klan and neo-Nazi politics in Louisiana and the United States. He brought what he called 'security teams' to protect white residents.

Trial and conviction

Sixteen-year-old Tyler was charged as an adult for first-degree murder, which under state law required the death penalty if he was convicted. If it had not been prosecuted as a capital crime and he had been charged as a juvenile, his maximum sentence would have been imprisonment in a juvenile facility until age 21. 

At the trial, the police produced a gun they claimed to have found on the bus, after it had been searched several times. (It had been allegedly stolen from the Sheriff department's firing range.) They said a witness testified that Tyler had pulled it from a slit in the seat. But, in the decades following the conviction, the witness recanted her testimony, and the gun disappeared from the evidence room.

Despite the lack of physical evidence tying him to the crime, Tyler was convicted at trial in 1975 by an all-white jury in a Louisiana state court. Observers thought the case was marked by several flaws, and noted that his court-appointed defense lawyer had no experience in capital cases. As Bob Herbert wrote in 2007 in The New York Times, the lawyer "had never handled a murder case, much less a death penalty case. He kept his meetings with his client to a minimum and would later complain about the money he was paid."

Under Louisiana law, since it was a capital case, conviction incurred the mandatory sentence of death, to be accomplished by electrocution. Tyler was taken to Louisiana State Prison, where at age 17, he was the youngest inmate on death row.

Changes in the death penalty laws
In Roberts v. Louisiana (1976), the United States Supreme Court ruled that Louisiana's death penalty statute was unconstitutional as it made the death penalty mandatory for certain murders, and it did not allow for consideration of mitigating factors or the exercise of mercy to spare a defendant's life. The USSC directed the Louisiana Supreme court to review the cases of all inmates on death row and commute their sentences to life in prison without parole, the next lower level of punishment. As a result, the Louisiana Supreme Court sentenced Tyler to life imprisonment without parole for at least 20 years. He joined the general prison population at Angola to serve his sentence.

The US Supreme Court ruled in Miller v. Alabama (2012), that mandatory life sentences without parole for persons convicted as minors was unconstitutional for all juvenile offenders, even for persons convicted of murder. The court ruled that this decision had to be applied retroactively, potentially affecting nearly 3000 persons nationally who had been convicted as minors and received such sentences. 

Tyler gained freedom following Louisiana Supreme Court review and consultation with the St. Charles Parish district attorney's office on his case. It drove a hard deal. The DA and court agreed to vacate Tyler's conviction for first-degree murder if Tyler agreed to enter a guilty plea to manslaughter. The judge sentenced him to the maximum of 21 years for that charge. Since Tyler had already served 41 years, nearly twice that time, he was finally released from prison on April 29, 2016.

Appeals and controversy
Tyler's case was appealed by defense counsel. In 1980 the United States Court of Appeals for the Fifth Circuit held that Tyler had been "convicted on an unconstitutional charge" (per the 1976 USSC Roberts decision) and that the trial was "fundamentally unfair". They noted that his attorney had failed to object to the judge making an improper charge to the jury, instructing them to "find that the defendant, Tyler, had intended 'the natural and probably consequences of his act', i.e. to kill or inflict great bodily harm on more than one person." The court vacated Tyler's conviction and remanded the case to the lower court, ordering a new trial. But the state appealed this decision based on his attorney's failure to object to the judge's instruction, which normally prevents redress of the conviction. In 1981 the Appeals Court reversed its earlier ruling. While reiterating its judgment that the trial had been unfair, it withdrew its instruction for another trial, because of his attorney's error. The US Supreme Court did not accept this case for hearing. 

In 1989 the Louisiana Board of Appeals recommended a pardon, based on Tyler's good behavior in prison. Five witnesses recanted the testimony they had presented at his trial. At the time Governor Buddy Roemer, a Democrat, was running against David Duke for election. He refused to consider the pardon as the election was racially charged. He feared a backlash from white voters if he freed Tyler.

Human-rights organizations, including Amnesty International, have argued that the legal process and procedures were flawed by the racially charged atmosphere of the period and by police intimidation of Tyler and witnesses. Due to the racial and political issues when Tyler was convicted, in 1994 Amnesty International described him as a "political prisoner".

In 2007 Bob Herbert of The New York Times wrote three columns about the case and the injustice committed against Tyler. His work helped raise the visibility of Tyler's plight. Amnesty International, a coalition of sports figures, and other groups made a renewed effort to gain executive clemency for Tyler. In 2007 his attorneys filed a petition with the Louisiana Parole Board requesting that they commute his life sentence to a defined number of years, which was necessary by state law in order to gain approval by the governor for executive clemency. Tyler did not gain a pardon; he had by then served 32 years in prison.

Tyler's supporters have claimed that there was a miscarriage of justice in his case. Some of the issues include:

 The white community of Destrehan High School, like others in the Deep South, was vehemently against integration and was anti-black. The school board had reluctantly adopted busing to achieve integration of the school 20 years after the Supreme Court ruled that segregation of public schools was unconstitutional. On the day of the shooting, 100-200 white students had been involved in a violent protest against black students. 
 The bus driver has insisted that he believes the shot was fired from outside of the bus.
 The bus driver observed the first search of the bus, and said that no gun was found on it.
 The gun which the police claim was used in the murder (and produced as evidence at the trial), was a Colt .45 government-issue. It was identified by officers of the parish sheriff's department as having been stolen from their firing range. The gun later disappeared from the sheriff's evidence room.
 The jury for Tyler's trial was all white; black people had been excluded by the prosecution.
 The 1981 US Court of Appeals, Fifth Circuit, ruled that the trial was based on an unconstitutional charge as it required a mandatory sentence (given the USSC's decision in Roberts v. Louisiana (1976) and was "fundamentally unfair", flawed by the trial judge's improper charge to the jury that the jury must find that the defendant, Tyler, had "intended the natural and probable consequences of his act".
 A person standing next to Timothy Weber suffered a minor injury when Weber was killed. The prosecution claimed that Tyler had acted "with a specific intent to kill or to inflict great bodily harm on more than one person" in order to convict him of the capital charge of first-degree murder.
 Four major witnesses against Tyler have recanted their testimony since the trial, claiming they were terrorized and pressured by police. For example, Larry Dabney, the key witness in the case against Tyler, was a  student sitting beside Tyler on the school bus when the shooting occurred. He described his experience with officers at the all-white police department:  Such statements are typical of the other witnesses used to convict the young Tyler.

Popular culture
 Gil Scott-Heron sang about Tyler in the song "Angola, Louisiana," on the 1978 album Secrets.
 British reggae band UB40 opened their 1980 debut album, Signing Off with the song "Tyler". The song name-checks the subject only as "Tyler" but they have often given Tyler's full name when introducing the song live. The band revisited the subject on the song "Rainbow Nation" on their 2008 album TwentyFourSeven.
 The British band Chumbawamba included the song "Waiting for the Bus" on their 2008 album The Boy Bands Have Won. The song tells the story from the imagined view of Tyler.

Citations

External links
 "Gary Tyler, framed up in 1974 desegregation fight, still in jail", The Militant, 2007.
 Free Gary Tyler website, three columns by Bob Herbert, published 2007 in New York Times
 "The Case of Gary Tyler: Despite Witness Recantations and No Physical Evidence, Louisiana Prisoner Remains Jailed After 32 Years", Democracy Now, 03 July 2001
 "Renewed calls for the release of Gary Tyler", World Socialist Website, March 2007

Living people
1958 births
African-American people
American people convicted of murder
American people convicted of manslaughter
American prisoners sentenced to death
People from St. Rose, Louisiana
People convicted of murder by Louisiana
Political prisoners
Political prisoners in the United States
Prisoners sentenced to death by Louisiana